Riders of the Dawn is a 1990 Spanish film, written and directed by Vicente Aranda, an adaptation of a novel by Jesús Fernández Santos. It stars Victoria Abril and Jorge Sanz.

Made as five-episode television miniseries for Televisión Española, it premiered at the 1990 Cannes Film Festival as two-part feature film. The miniseries was broadcast on La Primera Cadena of Televisión Española in 1991.

Synopsis 
The plot follows the life of Marian, a young woman whose greatest ambition is to be the owner of the spa resort, where she works. The action is set in Las Caldas, a small town in Asturias, where the lives of its inhabitants are forever changed by the arrival of the Asturian revolution of 1934 and the Spanish Civil War.

Cast
Victoria Abril as Marian
Jorge Sanz as Martín
 Maribel Verdú as Raquel
 Graciela Borges as Dona Amalia
 Fernando Guillén as Don Erasmo
 Gloria Muñoz as Adamina
 Antonio Iranzo as El Santero
 Joan Miralles as Ventura
 Nacho Martínez as Juan (Raquel's father)
 Claudia Gravy as Dona Elvira
 Carlos Tristancho as Quincelibras
 Lola Baldrich as Aida
Conrado San Martín as the doctor
Paco Catalá as the priest

External links
Web Oficial de Vicente Aranda
 

Spanish drama films
1990 films
1990s Spanish-language films
1990 drama films
Films directed by Vicente Aranda
RTVE shows
Television shows set in Asturias
1990s Spanish films